In medicine, decompression refers to the removal or repositioning of any structure compressing any other structure.

Common examples include decompressive craniectomy (removal of part of the skull to relieve pressure on the brain), and spinal decompression to relieve pressure on nerve roots.

References

Surgical procedures and techniques
Surgical removal procedures